Miramar is a place name of Spanish and Portuguese origin. It means "sea-view" or "sea sight" from mirar ("to look at, to watch") and mar ("sea"). It may refer to:

Places

Africa 
Miramar, Port Elizabeth, see St Dominic's Priory School

Asia 
Miramar, Goa

Europe 
Miramar, Théoule-sur-Mer, France
Miramar, Portugal, a small seaside town in Vila Nova de Gaia municipality, subregion of Greater Porto Area
Miramar, Valencia, Spain
Miramar (Málaga), one of the Districts of Málaga, Spain

North America 
Miramar, Havana, an upscale district in the municipality of Playa, Cuba
Miramar, Baja California, Mexico, see USS Yorktown (PG-1)
Miramar, Tamaulipas, Mexico
Miramar, Bocas del Toro, Panama
Miramar, Colón, Colón Province, Panama
Miramar, Puerto Rico, a neighborhood of San Juan
Miramar, San Diego, California
Miramar, Florida, a city in Broward County
Miramar Beach, California
Miramar Beach, Florida, Walton County
Miramar District, Costa Rica
Naval Consolidated Brig, Miramar, military prison operated by the U.S. Navy at Marine Corps Air Station Miramar in Miramar, San Diego, California

Oceania 
Miramar, New Zealand, a suburb of Wellington
The Miramar Peninsula, on which the suburb is located
Miramar (New Zealand electorate), a parliamentary constituency

South America 
Miramar, Buenos Aires, Argentina
Miramar, Córdoba, Argentina

Landmarks
Mira Place, formerly Miramar Shopping Centre, Hong Kong
Miramar (mansion), a historic home on Aquidneck Island at Newport, Rhode Island, US
Miramar Entertainment Park, Taipei, Taiwan
Miramar Palace, Donostia-San Sebastián, Basque Country, Spain
Miramare (also known as Schloß Miramar), Trieste, Italy, a palace owned by Emperor Maximilian I of Mexico
Marine Corps Air Station Miramar, San Diego, California, United States
San Diego Miramar College, California, United States
California Miramar University, San Diego, California, United States

Other uses
Estación de Miramar (es), a station on the Port Vell Aerial Tramway in Barcelona, Spain
, Parque Batlle, Montevideo; see Uruguayan Basketball Federation
Miramar Misiones, a football (soccer) club in Montevideo, Uruguay
Miramar Futsal Clube, a defunct futsal club in Valadares, Portugal
Miramar (novel), 1967 novel written by Naguib Mahfouz
Miramar Hotel and Investment, a Hong Kong hotel chain company
, later USS SP-672, a United States Navy patrol boat in commission from 1917 to 1918
Miramar Esporte Clube, a Brazilian football (soccer) club
Miramar (Weinheim), water park and sauna complex in Germany

See also
Miramare (disambiguation)